The Red Hook Marine Terminal is an intermodal freight transport facility that includes a container terminal located on the Upper New York Bay in the Port of New York and New Jersey. The maritime facility in Red Hook section of Brooklyn, New York handles container ships and bulk cargo.
The Port Authority of New York and New Jersey (PANYNJ) bought the piers in the 1950s when there was still much break bulk cargo activity in the port. The container terminal  was built in the 1980s,

There are two active container cranes along 2,080 feet berth, 3,140 feet of breakbulk berth space, two major bulk-handling yards, and approximately 400,000 square feet of warehouse. In October 2011 the PANYNJ took over operations at the site. In 2011, the terminal handled 110,000 containers.  Red Hook Container Terminal LLC operates the terminal on the Port Authority's behalf in an agreement set to end in 2018.  Nearly all labor on the terminal is supplied by Local 1814 of the International Longshoremans Association union.

See also 

 Brooklyn Cruise Terminal
 Howland Hook Marine Terminal
 Port Jersey Marine Terminal
 Port Newark-Elizabeth Marine Terminal
 South Brooklyn Marine Terminal
 Geography of New York-New Jersey Harbor Estuary

References

External links 
 Port Authority site on Howland Hook
 New York Container Terminal, Inc.
 Red Hook Container Terminal LLC

Port Authority of New York and New Jersey
Ports and harbors of New York (state)
Container terminals
Rail freight transportation in New York City
Port of New York and New Jersey
Transportation buildings and structures in Brooklyn
Red Hook, Brooklyn